J Benjamin C Whitaker (born 15 May 1956, died 21 Sept 2022) was Professor of Chemical Physics in the School of Chemistry at the University of Leeds.

Whitaker was educated at University College School, London and the University of Sussex (B.Sc. in chemical physics, 1978) where he also completed his doctorate on laser induced emission spectroscopy under the supervision of Professor Tony McCaffery (D.Phil., 1981). He was mainly known for work in molecular reaction dynamics and photofragment-ion imaging. He was also associated with some of the early chemical applications of the web with Henry Rzepa. He was also a committed science communicator and educator, and a founding member of the Superposition arts-science collective. As of 2021, he was on the executive committee of Scientists for Labour. He died in September 2022 following a period of illness.

Selected publications

References

1956 births
Living people
Alumni of the University of Sussex
Academics of the University of Leeds
People educated at University College School